Legionovia Legionowo can refer to the following:

Legionovia Legionowo (football)
Legionovia Legionowo (women's volleyball)